Sontag Hotel was the first European hotel in Seoul, Korea, built in 1902. The hotel was sold in 1917 and eventually demolished in 1922.

The 25-room hotel was bestowed to a German Russian, Antoinette Sontag, by Emperor Gojong. She was the sister-in-law of the Russian ambassador, Karl Waeber. It is said that she could speak German, Russian, English and also some Korean, gaining wider acknowledgement from the royal family. However, she was almost expelled from Korea when Japan's influence in Korea grew.

Location
Bestowed land was next to Deoksugung palace. Later, the emperor granted the hotel to Sontag, for whom the hotel was named after. It was also called the Guest Hall in Hansung and Sontag's Residence. Currently, it is presumed to be by the centennial memorial hall of Ewha Girl's High School. 

The first Dabang, or coffee shop, was opened in the hotel where most westerners resided in Seoul visited at the time. Several famous people, including British Prime Minister Winston Churchill and American writer Jack London, also stayed at Sontag Hotel while on a visit to Korea. The first Prime Minister of Japan, Itō Hirobumi, invited the authorities of the Empire of Korea here.

Miscellaneous
 In 1976, the notable writer, Cha Bum-seok completed his screenplay named "Sontag Hotel". Later in 2005, this script became  transformed as a musical.
 In 2012, Lee Soon-woo published the book named Sontag Hotel, featuring the modern diplomatic history surrounding Korean peninsula and life of Sontag.

References 

Korean Empire
Demolished hotels
Demolished buildings and structures in South Korea
Buildings and structures demolished in 1922